Jerry Elmer Winholtz (August 5, 1874 – June 16, 1962) was an American wrestler who competed in the 1904 Summer Olympics. In 1904, he lost his first match to Fred Hussman in the lightweight class, and then went on to win a bronze medal in welterweight class.

References

External links
profile

1874 births
1962 deaths
Wrestlers at the 1904 Summer Olympics
American male sport wrestlers
Olympic bronze medalists for the United States in wrestling
Medalists at the 1904 Summer Olympics